Henry Francis Cockayne-Cust (15 September 1819 – 5 April 1884), was a British Conservative Party politician.

Background
Born Henry Cust, Cockayne-Cust was the eldest son of Reverend Henry Cust, Canon of Windsor, younger son of Brownlow Cust, 1st Baron Brownlow. His mother was Lady Anna Maria Elizabeth, daughter of Francis Needham, 1st Earl of Kilmorey. He later assumed the additional surname of Cockayne by Royal licence.  He was educated at Eton College.

Political and military career
Cockayne-Cust was a captain in the 8th Hussars and a Major in the Shropshire Yeomanry. In 1874 he entered Parliament as one of two representatives for Grantham, a seat he held until 1880.

Family
Cockayne-Cust married Sara Jane, daughter of Isaac Cookson and widow of Sidney Robert Streatfield, in 1852. They had two sons and four daughters. Their eldest son was Henry Cust. Sara Jane died in childbirth in September 1867. Cockayne-Cust remained a widower until his death in April 1884, aged 64. His youngest son Adelbert succeeded as fifth Baron Brownlow in 1921.

References

1819 births
1884 deaths
Shropshire Yeomanry officers
Conservative Party (UK) MPs for English constituencies
8th King's Royal Irish Hussars officers
UK MPs 1874–1880
Henry Cockayne-Cust